Stephen Harding was an English-born monk, abbot, and Christian saint.

Stephen Harding may also refer to:
Stephen Harding (cricketer), mid 18th-century English cricketer
Stephen S. Harding (1808–1891), Governor of the Utah Territory
Stephen E. Harding (born 1955), British biochemist
Stephen Harding (barrister) (fl. 2010s), Attorney General for the Isle of Man
Stephen Harding (politician) (fl. 2010s), politician from the U.S. state of Connecticut